Viktor Nikolaevich Tyumenev (June 1, 1957 — August 2, 2018) was a Russian ice hockey player who played in the Soviet Hockey League. He played for HC Spartak Moscow and Krylya Sovetov Moscow. He also played for the Soviet national team during the 1979 Challenge Cup against the NHL All-Stars. He was born in Moscow, Soviet Union.

He was inducted into the Russian and Soviet Hockey Hall of Fame in 1982.

Career statistics

Regular season and playoffs

International

References

External links
 
 Russian and Soviet Hockey Hall of Fame bio
 Viktor Tyumenev's profile at Sports Reference.com

1957 births
2018 deaths
HC CSKA Moscow players
Ice hockey players at the 1984 Winter Olympics
KalPa players
EC Kapfenberg players
KooKoo players
Krylya Sovetov Moscow players
Los Angeles Kings scouts
Medalists at the 1984 Winter Olympics
Olympic gold medalists for the Soviet Union
Olympic ice hockey players of the Soviet Union
Olympic medalists in ice hockey
Russian ice hockey left wingers
SaPKo players
Soviet expatriate ice hockey players
Soviet ice hockey left wingers
HC Spartak Moscow players
Ice hockey people from Moscow
HC TPS players
Vancouver Canucks draft picks
Soviet expatriate sportspeople in Finland